Peter Ronald Godfrey (born 15 March 1938) is an English former professional footballer who played as a Winger.

Born in Woolwich, he played for Charlton Athletic, Gillingham, Chesterfield and Exeter City between 1955 and 1967.

References

1938 births
Living people
Footballers from Woolwich
English footballers
Association football wingers
Charlton Athletic F.C. players
Gillingham F.C. players
Chesterfield F.C. players
Exeter City F.C. players